Villa Horror is a 2006 Cambodian horror film, produced by Campro production.

Plot 
A Ghost of a man possessed the old villa seeking revenge from the family of a man who had stolen this villa for decades. He started his revenge by killing the builder, the family's relative and everyone who wanted this ancient house. Can they find a way to stop him?

External links
 Official Website
 

2006 films
2006 horror films
Cambodian horror films
Films directed by Heng Tola